Peter Heinz Feist (most often Peter H. Feist) (29 July 1928 – 26 July 2015) was a German art historian.

Life 
Feist was born  in 1928 in Warnsdorf in northern Bohemia, where he grew up. His father Georg H. Feist was a surgeon and in 1926 he moved with his wife from Prague to Warnsdorf, where he took over the management of the municipal hospital. Peter's mother, Isolde Feist née Sojka, was a nurse who as a so-called half-Jewish woman converted to Lutheranism before her marriage in 1923; her father was a wealthy wine and spirits merchant from Reichenberg. Verlag der Kunst, Dresden 1978 (Fundus-Reihe 51/52).
 Monet. 2nd edition. Verlag der Kunst, Dresden 1983.
 Geschichte der deutschen Kunst. E. A. Seemann Verlag, Leipzig. A total of 8 volumes, including 2 volumes by Peter H. Feist herausgegeben:
 Band 1760–1848. Leipzig 1986, . (among others with Thomas Häntzsche, Ulrike Krenzlin, Gisold Lammel, Helga Paditz).
 Band 1848–1890. Leipzig 1987, . (among others with Dieter Golgner, Ulrike Krenzlin, Gisold Lammel).
 Renoir. Ein Traum von Harmonie. Taschen Verlag, Cologne 1987, .
 Impressionismus. Die Entdeckung der Freizeit. E. A. Seemann-Verlag, Leipzig, 1993, .
 Figur und Objekt. Plastik im 20. Jahrhundert – eine Einführung und 200 Biographien. Seemann Verlag, Leipzig 1996, .
 . Zweihundertzehn Porträts deutschsprachiger Autoren aus vier Jahrhunderten. 2nd edition. J. B. Metzler’sche Verlagsbuchhandlung und Carl Ernst Poeschel Verlag, Stuttgart 2007,  (with Peter Betthausen and Christiane Fork).
 Französischer Impressionismus. Malerei des Impressionismus 1860–1920. Taschen Verlag, Cologne 1995, .
 Hauptstraßen und eigene Wege – Rückschau eines Kunsthistorikers. With an epilogue by Horst Bredekamp. Lukas Verlag für Kunst- und Geistesgeschichte, Berlin 2016, .

Literature 
 Lothar Mertens: Lexikon der DDR-Historiker. Biographien und Bibliographien zu den Geschichtswissenschaftlern aus der Deutschen Demokratischen Republik. Saur, Munich 2006, .
 Jan Wielgohs: "Feist, Peter Heinz". In: Wer war wer in der DDR? 5th edition. Volume 1, Ch. Links, Berlin 2010, .
 Horst Bredekamp: Nachruf. In Peter H. Feist: Hauptstraßen und eigene Wege, Rückschau eines Kunsthistorikers. Lukas Verlag für Kunst- und Geistesgeschichte, Berlin 2016, .
 Peter Betthausen, Michael Feist (ed.): Nachlese. Ansichten von Bildender Kunst und Kunstgeschichte (Textsammlung). Lukas Verlag für Kunst- und Geistesgeschichte, Berlin 2016, 200 p. (with complete bibliography), .
 Peter Arlt (ed.): Künstler, Kunstwerk und Gesellschaft – Gedenkveranstaltung  für Peter H. Feist, 8 December 2016. With contributions from Hans-Otto Dill, Emerita Pansowova, Fritz Jacobi, Jens Semrau, Ulrike Krenzlin, Gerd-Helge Vogel, Peter Arlt, Michael Feist, Harald Metzkes, Claude Keisch, Peter Michel, Ronald Paris, Diana Al-Jumaili. Meeting reports of the Leibniz-Sozietät der Wissenschaften in Berlin, volume 132, year 2017. trafo Wissenschaftsverlag Dr. Wolfgang Weist, Berlin 2017, 
 Curriculum Vitae Prof. Dr. Peter H. Feist. In Peter Arlt (ed.): Künstler, Kunstwerk und Gesellschaft – Gedenkveranstaltung für Peter H. Feist, 8 December 2016. Meeting reports of the Leibniz-Sozietät der Wissenschaften in Berlin, volume 132, year 2017. trafo Wissenschaftsverlag Dr. Wolfgang Weist, Berlin 2017, .

References

External links 
 
 Dürfen Kommunisten träumen?, Article by Peter H. Feist about the pictures in Palast der Republik in the Berliner Zeitung date 27 April 2001

German art historians
Members of the German Academy of Sciences at Berlin
Academic staff of the Humboldt University of Berlin
Recipients of the National Prize of East Germany
Recipients of the Patriotic Order of Merit in bronze
Socialist Unity Party of Germany members
1928 births
2015 deaths
People from Varnsdorf
Luftwaffenhelfer